Susan Browning (born Susan Brown; February 25, 1941 – April 23, 2006) was an American actress.

Early years 
Browning was born Susan Brown in Baldwin, New York, and graduated from Baldwin High School in 1958. She attended Penn State University where she was a member of Kappa Alpha Theta and graduated with a bachelor's degree in theater arts in 1962. She changed her last name to differentiate herself from another actress named Susan Brown.

Career 
After Browning finished college, she acted with the Equity Library Theatre. Impresario Julius Monk saw her in a musical production there and signed her for a revue, Dime a Dozen, at Plaza 9. She was in that show for a year and left to make her debut on Broadway in Love and Kisses.

Browning was nominated for two Tony Awards: for Best Actress in a Musical for Company in 1971 and for Best Featured Actress in a Musical for Goodtime Charley in 1975. She was also featured on Broadway in the musicals Big River and Shelter, as well as several plays.

Browning played one of the nuns in the 1992 movie Sister Act, as well as its 1993 sequel Sister Act 2: Back in the Habit. Her television work included appearances on Love Is a Many Splendored Thing, Law & Order, All My Children, Mary Hartman, Mary Hartman, The Monkees, The Girl From U.N.C.L.E., and The Wild Wild West.

Death 
Browning died on April 23, 2006, in New York City after a brief illness, according to friends in the theatre community. She was 65 years old.

Filmography

References

External links

1941 births
2006 deaths
American film actresses
American stage actresses
Pennsylvania State University alumni
20th-century American actresses
21st-century American women
Broadway theatre people